Lauscha is a town in the district of Sonneberg, in Thuringia, Germany. It is situated 13 km north of Sonneberg, and 24 km southwest of Saalfeld.  Lauscha is known for its glassblowing, especially for Christmas tree decorations like baubles.

Geography

Lauscha is located in the mountain range of the Thüringer Schiefergebirge. The town is nestled into the steep valley of a tributary of the river Steinach just below the ridge of the mountain chain, the well-known Rennsteig.  The main train station in Lauscha is 611 m above sealevel, the Pappenheimer Berg, the highest mountain within the town limits rises up to 834,5 m above sea level.

Neighbouring towns

Immediate neighbours are the following towns and villages:
Neuhaus am Rennweg
Lichte
Piesau
Oberland am Rennsteig
Steinach
Steinheid
Ernstthal am Rennsteig in the north east is part of Lauscha since 1994.

Topography

The town and valley of Lauscha get their name from the stream, which was first mentioned as 'lutzscha' in 1366. Clean water is one of the requirements for making glass, the others being the availability of sand (from a nearby quarry in Steinheid), natron, potash and a sufficient supply of timber.
In former times there were five mills which all have been long closed. However, some of them continue to live on in the placenames Obermühle, Wiesleinsmmühle and Göritzmühle.

Since the completion of the rail connection and the road from Steinach to Neuhaus at the turn of the 20th century, the Lauscha river is largely confined to an underground channel. Before that the connection roads were restricted to the slopes because of the swampy ground of the valley. This can still be read in names of roads like 'Alter Weg' and 'Alte Chausee'.

Typically for the Thüringer Schiefergebirge, broad and almost level mountain tops surround a deeply carved-in valley.

In Literature
Lauscha is the setting for the novel The Glassblower by Petra Durst-Benning (originally published in German in 2003). The novel fictionalizes the invention of glass Christmas ornaments in Lauscha by imagining them as the production of a family of three sisters left to fend for themselves after the death of their father.

Sons and daughters of the town
 Eduard Müller (* May 31, 1855, † 1912 in Rudolstadt), manufacturer, commercial councilor and politician of the Nationalliberal Party (NLP)
 Ursula Buckel (* February 11, 1926; † December 5, 2005 in Geneva), soprano

See also
 Silvering

References

External links
 Webcam-lauscha.de

Sonneberg (district)
Duchy of Saxe-Meiningen